The 2009 Maaco Bowl Las Vegas was an NCAA-sanctioned Division I FBS post-season college football bowl game, in which the Brigham Young Cougars defeated the Oregon State Beavers 44–20. The game was played on Tuesday, December 22, 2009, at 5 p.m. PST at 40,000-seat Sam Boyd Stadium, University of Nevada, Las Vegas, in Whitney, Nevada, and was televised on ESPN.

BYU played in the Las Vegas Bowl for the fifth straight year. BYU had gone 2–2 against Pac-10 opponents in the last four Las Vegas Bowls. This was the ninth meeting between the two teams, although the first time they met in this bowl game. Prior to the 2009 Las Vegas Bowl, Oregon State had a 5–3 lead in the series, winning the last meeting 10–7 in 1986. This was the first postseason meeting between the two teams. Bronco Mendenhall, head coach for Brigham Young, is an Oregon State alumnus and it was revealed during the broadcast that he chose Oregon State specifically because Brigham Young did not recruit him and Oregon State had a game with BYU scheduled for the 1986 season. The 2009 game was the first meeting of two ranked teams in the bowl game's history.

Game summary
BYU wore their alternate royal blue jerseys, and OSU wore their away white jerseys.

Weather was a significant factor in the game, with wind gusts up to 50 mph at times.  At one point in the game the net used to catch field goals and PAT attempts, blew into the goalpost and became lodged, causing several minutes of delays as the game officials and field workers addressed the problems.  ESPN, who was providing television coverage of the game, was forced to take down its Skycam, which traverses above the field, due to safety concerns created by the high winds.  Oregon State was also unable to punt very well with the wind. They had 2 punts into the wind which netted 6 yards each.

BYU was led by Senior Quarterback, Max Hall who threw for 192 yards and three touchdowns on his way to being named the bowl's MVP.  Harvey Unga was the leading rusher for the Cougars with 76 yards on the ground to go with one rushing touchdown.  BYU was also able to shut down the highly touted Rodgers brothers of Oregon State.  RB Jacquizz Rodgers who goes by the nickname of Quizz, finished the season with 1,440 yards rushing and 21 touchdowns was held to a season-low 63 yards and a touchdown on 18 carries.  His brother James Rodgers, who finished the season with over 1,000 yards receiving, only had 4 catches for 30 yards.

Scoring summary

References

Maaco Bowl Las Vegas
Las Vegas Bowl
BYU Cougars football bowl games
Oregon State Beavers football bowl games
Maaco Bowl
December 2009 sports events in the United States